Clark Air Base is a Philippine Air Force base on Luzon Island in the Philippines, located  west of Angeles City, about  northwest of Metro Manila. Clark Air Base was previously a United States military facility, operated by the U.S. Air Force under the aegis of Pacific Air Forces (PACAF) and their predecessor organizations from 1903 to 1991. The base covered  with a military reservation extending north that covered another .

The base was a stronghold of the combined Philippine and American forces during the final months of World War II and a backbone of logistical support during the Vietnam War until 1975. Following the departure of American forces in 1991 due to the eruption of Mount Pinatubo, the base became the site of Clark International Airport, as well as the Clark Freeport Zone and the Air Force City of the Philippine Air Force.

In April 2016, an Air Contingent of USAF A-10s and HH-60s was deployed from U.S. air bases in Pyeongtaek and Okinawa to Clark. The Air Contingent was composed of five A-10C Thunderbolt IIs from the 51st Fighter Wing, Osan AB, South Korea; three HH-60G Pave Hawks from the 18th Wing, Kadena AB, Japan; and approximately 200 personnel deployed from multiple Pacific Air Force units. The primary mission of the contingent appears to be to patrol disputed South China Sea islands, "to provide greater and more transparent air and maritime domain awareness to ensure safety for military and civilian activities in international waters and airspace." The air contingent builds upon previous deployments by U.S. Navy P-8 Poseidon aircraft to Clark.

History

Clark Air Base was originally established as Fort Stotsenburg in Sapang Bato, Angeles, Pampanga in 1903 under control of the U.S. Army. A portion of Fort Stotsenburg was officially set aside for the Aviation Section of the Signal Corps and named Clark Field in September 1919 after Harold M. Clark. Clark later served as a landing field for U.S. Army Air Corps medium bombers and accommodated half of the heavy bombers stationed in the Philippines during the 1930s. It was very large for an air field of its day, and in the late summer and fall of 1941, many aircraft were sent to Clark in anticipation of a war with Imperial Japan. However, most of them were destroyed on the ground during an air raid nine hours after the Pearl Harbor attack.

The base was overrun by Japanese forces in early January 1942 and became a major center for Japanese air operations. Japanese aircraft flying out of Clark participated in the Battle of Leyte Gulf, the largest naval battle of the Second World War.

During the war, the Allied prisoners on the Bataan Death March passed by the main gate of Clark Air Base as they followed the railway tracks north towards Camp O'Donnell. Clark Air Base was recaptured by Americans in January 1945, after three months of fierce fighting to liberate the Philippines. It was immediately returned to U.S. Army Air Forces control.

Clark grew into a major American air base during the Cold War, it being launching pad for Korean War and serving as an important logistics hub during the Vietnam War. Before extensive damage from the Mount Pinatubo volcanic eruption of 1991, the Philippine government offered to renew the leases on Clark, Subic and a handful of smaller bases for $825 million annually. After the volcanic eruption, the U.S. offered about $200 million annually and only for Subic; the lease for Clark was not renewed.

In November 1991, the United States Air Force lowered the U.S. flag and transferred Clark Air Base to the Philippine government. With the United States military's withdrawal from Clark, the base was systematically looted by the local population and was left abandoned for several years. It finally became the Clark Freeport Zone, the site of Clark International Airport (CIA) and parts of it are still owned and operated by the Philippine Air Force, retaining the same name, Clark Air Base.

In June 2012, the Philippine government, under pressure from Chinese claims to their seas, agreed to the return of American military forces to Clark.

Military units

During much of the Cold War, Clark Air Base's activity largely revolved around the 405th Fighter Wing, later renumbered as the 3rd Tactical Fighter Wing in September 1974 and its fleet of F-4 Phantom II fighter jets. It also hosted an interceptor squadron and a flight school, all of which flew a variety of other combat aircraft. Transient aircraft of many types, especially cargo jets, were common.

In November 1973, headquarters for the 374th Tactical Airlift Wing was transferred from Ching Chuan Kang Air Base, Taiwan, to Clark Air Base. With this move came two squadrons of C-130E transport aircraft, the 21st Tactical Airlift Squadron and the 776th Tactical Airlift Squadron.

Clark was served regularly by cargo and passenger flights to and from Andersen AFB, Guam; Kadena AB, Japan; Diego Garcia; Jakarta, Indonesia; Bangkok and Ubon Thailand; and Saigon, South Vietnam (until 1975). During the 1970s, passengers arrived via Trans International Douglas DC-8 and Braniff International DC-8s (the Pickle and the Banana) flights from Travis AFB, California (via Honolulu and Guam).

By 1980, the base had grown to such an extent that weekly Flying Tigers Boeing 747 service to St. Louis (via Kadena AB Japan; Anchorage; and Los Angeles) had begun. The 747 service was taken over by Tower Air sometime in the late 1980s and was augmented with a weekly Hawaiian Airlines L-1011 or Douglas DC-8 to Guam-Honolulu-Los Angeles.

Shootings
On October 29, 1987, unidentified gunmen shot and killed three airmen.

On May 14, 1990, suspected New People's Army (NPA) communist rebels shot and killed two airmen.

Culture

Clark Air Base was arguably the most urbanized military facility in history and was the largest American base overseas. At its peak around 1990, it had a permanent population of 15,000. It had a base exchange, large commissary, small shopping arcade, branch department store, cafeterias, teen centers, hotel, miniature golf, riding stables, zoo, and other concessions.

Recreation
Angeles City bars were legendary, particularly around the red-light district on Fields Avenue. As a result, Clark's servicemen's clubs were under considerable pressure to serve its members with wholesome entertainment. All three were large-scale operations: the Officer's Club (CABOOM) near the parade ground, the Top Hat Club for non-commissioned officers (NCOs) near Lily Hill, which moved to near the Silver Wing in 1986, and the Coconut Grove Airmen Open Mess (AOM) housed in a large vaulted room that contained palm trees. The officer's club featured a four star dining room, but catered to NCO's during lunchtime. The airman's club got first dibs on Broadway shows and swing bands due to an agreement that whoever paid transportation costs got priority. The NCO club came second. The airman's club had numerous theme bars and rental girls for dance partners during swing band tenures on the large dance floor. The club security (bouncers) were outfitted in formal PI wear each evening of a different hue. The PI formal wear for men was lace shirts (the barong Tagalog) with French cuffs, traditional and very elegant. The volume of enlisted troops flowing through PI to Vietnam created a large audience for AOM offerings. The NCO Club was still a very extensive operation and operated an upscale dining room, an in-house thrift shop, a pinball arcade, and a calendar of daily activities. It regularly brought major bands and artists from the United States to perform.

At least a hundred sponsored clubs and organizations were active on the base, including the Knights of Columbus, a Latino American club, the Civil Air Patrol, and martial arts dojos. Two major movie theaters operated daily: the Bobbitt Theater which played first-run films, and the Kelly Theater which showed older releases. By 1988 the Kelly Theater ceased showing films and was used mainly for Commander's Calls and large squadron-sized meetings. In the late 1960s and early 1970s, movies were also shown at the Bamboo Bowl, the football stadium on base.

The Bamboo Bowl, later renamed Challenger Field, was used mainly for high school football games as the school did not have its own athletic field. In addition to high school football games, it also hosted recreational league football games for ages 8–18. The high school football teams were included as part of the recreational league. The base's sole high school, Wagner High, had multiple football teams. It was also used for the base's 11-man tackle football league, which not only included teams from Clark but from Subic Naval Base as well.

To keep the residents entertained at home, Clark had an active broadcast center called FEN, or Far East Network Philippines, a division of American Forces Network. A television station broadcast on Channel 8, then Channel 17 after 1981. It showed about 20 hours per day of syndicated programs from the "big three" networks in the United States, with local news and talk programs. The content was locally syndicated until 1983 when it began airing live programming by satellite from Los Angeles.

FEN had two 24-hour radio stations: an AM station which broadcast news and popular music, and stereo FM which was dedicated to easy-listening and classical music. Local Filipino TV also aired newer American shows than FEN did. Unlike the local TV stations in Europe, they were broadcast in the same format as American TV and not dubbed in Tagalog, the local language.  Likewise, several American-styled radio stations in Manila were popular with Clark residents: one notable example in the 1980s was 99.5 DWRT-FM.

Two major annual events at Clark were the annual Chili Cookoff, held near the Silver Wing recreation center around September, and the Happening on the Green ("the HOG") in February. The HOG attracted thousands of residents. Amusements and rides were built and operated not only by Filipino entertainment contractors but also by individual Air Force units seeking to boost unit morale, showcase their talents, and raise unit funds.

Because of the warm climate and the large number of units, slow pitch softball tournaments were held quarterly. There were at least two gymnasiums, three walking/running tracks and seven softball fields on base. There were also tennis courts, a clubhouse with tennis merchandise, and tennis pros available for a couple of dollars per hour to hit with you at any time. They had a local tournament each year.

Pop culture references
In 2013, author Nick Auclair published Steel's Treasure, a fictional novel set on Clark Air Base.

The 1969 novel "One to Count Cadence", by James Crumley, has its initial setting in an Army unit stationed at Clark Air Base, and has become the "Catch 22" novel of the Vietnam War.

Education
The Department of Defense Dependents Schools (DoDDS) operated six schools at Clark Air Base, serving children from kindergarten to twelfth grade.

 Elementary schools (kindergarten-5th grade): MacArthur Elementary School, V. I. Grissom Elementary School, and Wurtsmith Elementary School. The latter two were located in the hill housing area.  Most officers and senior enlisted families attended Grissom. 
 Middle schools (6th–8th grade): Lily Hill Middle School, and Wagner Middle School. The latter primarily served the hill housing area and officer dependents.
 High school: Wagner High School, known as Clark Dependent School in the 1950s and Wurtsmith Memorial High School in the 1960s.

Clark was also home to several community colleges, namely the Pacific Far East Campus of Central Texas College. Most classes were held in the evenings at Wagner High School.

Higher commands
Clark Air Base was assigned to the following major commands:
 War Dept, 1903
 Philippine Dept, 1917
 The Adjutant General of the Army, Dept of the Philippines, 1919
 Air Forces, United States Army Forces in the Far East, August 4, 1941
 Philippines Dept Air Force, September 20, 1941
 Redesignated: Far East Air Force, December 20, 1941
 Occupied by the Imperial Japanese Army between December 20, 1941, and February 10, 1945
 Sixth United States Army, February 16, 1945
 Eighth United States Army, May 15, 1945
 Far East Air Force, June 1945
 Redesignated: Pacific Air Command, USA, December 6, 1945
 Redesignated: Far East Air Force, January 1, 1947
 Redesignated: Pacific Air Forces, July 1, 1957 – December 16, 1991

Climate
Climate at the base is characterized by two distinct seasons: a "dry season" from November through April, and a "rainy season" with monsoon rains that occur from May through October.  During the dry season, winds are usually northeasterly and skies are fair.  Some afternoon showers tend to appear by April.  April brings the highest average temperatures of any month, though the hottest days of the year tend to occur in May. Due to the very dry state of vegetation at this time, ash and soot often falls on Clark Air Base as farmers burn their fields for planting.  During drought years, wildfires occasionally broke out in the overgrown areas west of the golf course and northeast of the airfield.

Rainy season normally arrives during the month of June.  July and August are wet, with many dark overcast days, and frequent afternoon and evening rains.  Typhoons are common in late summer and fall, approaching from the east.  They are rarely strong at Clark Air Base as the facilities are far inland, and the typhoon circulation is disrupted by the Sierra Madre mountain range on the east coast.  Rain and typhoon activity diminishes sharply by November and December, when the dry season arrives once again.  Temperatures are at their coolest, with nighttime lows sometimes falling to 64 °F (18 °C) or lower.

See also
 Clark Freeport Zone
 Clark International Airport
 Clark Veterans Cemetery

Other United States Air Force installations in the Philippines:
 Camp O'Donnell
 Crow Valley Range Complex
 John Hay Air Base
 Mactan Air Base
 Wallace Air Station

General:
 Geography of the Philippines
 Military History of the Philippines
 Military History of the United States
 United States Army Air Forces in the South West Pacific Theatre

References

Bibliography
 Fletcher, Harry R. (1989) Air Force Bases Volume II, Active Air Force Bases outside the United States of America on September 17, 1982. Maxwell AFB, Alabama: Office of Air Force History. 
 Mandocdoc, M. and David, C.P. 2008. Dieldrin Contamination of the Groundwater in a Former US Military Base (Clark Air Base, Philippines). CLEAN Air, Soil, Water Journal 36 (10–11), 870–874.
 Martin, Patrick (1994). Tail Code: The Complete History of USAF Tactical Aircraft Tail Code Markings. Schiffer Military Aviation History. .
 Maurer, Maurer (1983). Air Force Combat Units of World War II. Maxwell AFB, Alabama: Office of Air Force History. .
 Ravenstein, Charles A. (1984). Air Force Combat Wings Lineage and Honors Histories 1947–1977. Maxwell AFB, Alabama: Office of Air Force History. .
 Rogers, Brian (2005). United States Air Force Unit Designations Since 1978. Hinkley, England: Midland Publications. .
 Auclair, Nick (2013). Steel's Treasure. On The Fence Writers. .

Further reading

External links

 Clark Air Base website - contains numerous maps and diagrams
 Clark Field Baptist Church - history of Clark Field Baptist Church
 Steels Treasure website - fiction novel set on Clark Air Base

Installations of the United States Air Force in the Philippines
1903 establishments in the Philippines
Military facilities in Pampanga
Air force installations of the Philippines
History of Pampanga
Buildings and structures in Angeles City
Buildings and structures in Mabalacat